This list of mines in Kyrgyzstan is subsidiary to the list of mines article and lists working, defunct and future mines in the country and is organised by the primary mineral output. For practical purposes stone, marble and other quarries may be included in this list.

Beryllium
Kalesay mine

Copper
Bozymchak

Gold
Kumtor Gold Mine
Makmal gold mine
Talas mine
Unkurtash mine

Uranium
Mailuu-Suu

References

Kyrgyzstan